David "Soldier" Wilson (23 July 1883 – 27 October 1906) was an English professional footballer who played as a centre forward. Born in Hebburn, he earned his nickname as a teenager while serving with the Cameron Highlanders and the 1st Battalion, Black Watch. He also served in South Africa during the Boer War.

Wilson began his footballing career in Scotland with Raith Rovers. He left the Army to play professional football with Scottish Football League Division One side Dundee and later had a spell with Edinburgh club Heart of Midlothian. At the start of the 1905–06 season, Wilson moved to England to join Football League Second Division side Hull City. After scoring three goals in ten league matches, he was signed by Leeds City for a transfer fee of £150. During his first season at Leeds Wilson made 15 league appearances and scored 13 goals, making him the club's top scorer in the 1905–06 campaign.

While playing for Leeds City against Burnley on 27 October 1906, Wilson left the pitch during the second half after suffering chest pains. When two of his teammates sustained injuries at the same time, he returned to the field of play against medical advice. However, he was unable to complete the match and had departed the pitch when Burnley inside forward Arthur Bell scored a late winner for the visitors. Wilson collapsed and had to be carried to the Leeds dressing room where he died despite efforts to resuscitate him. A subsequent post mortem found that Wilson had died from a heart attack.

See also
List of association footballers who died while playing

References

1883 births
1906 deaths
People from Hebburn
Footballers from Tyne and Wear
English footballers
Association football forwards
Raith Rovers F.C. players
Dundee F.C. players
Heart of Midlothian F.C. players
Scottish Football League players
English Football League players
Hull City A.F.C. players
Leeds City F.C. players
Black Watch soldiers
Association football players who died while playing
British Army personnel of the Second Boer War
English people of Scottish descent
Sport deaths in England
Queen's Own Cameron Highlanders soldiers